The green sunfish (Lepomis cyanellus) is a species of freshwater fish in the sunfish family (Centrarchidae) of order Perciformes.  A panfish popular with anglers, the green sunfish is also kept as an aquarium fish by hobbyists.  They are usually caught by accident, while fishing for other game fish. Green sunfish can be caught with live bait such as nightcrawlers, waxworms, mealworms, and blood worms. Grocery store baits such as pieces of hot dog or corn kernels can even catch fish. Green sunfish are aggressive and will hit small lures.  They can be caught with fly fishing tackle.

Geographic distribution
The green sunfish is native to a wide area of North America, from the Rocky Mountains in the west to the Appalachian Mountains in the east and from the Hudson Bay basin in Canada to the Gulf Coast in the United States and northern Mexico.  They are specifically indigenous to a number of lakes and rivers such as the Great Lakes and some of the basins of the Mississippi River.

Green sunfish have been introduced to many bodies of water all across the United States.  The green sunfish is considered an invasive species by the states of Arizona, California, Florida, Georgia and New Jersey, with unconfirmed presence in Vermont and New Hampshire, namely the Connecticut River and its tributaries.  Their invasive potential is due in part to their penchant for chasing other sunfish away from mutually preferred habitat of submerged vegetation, a form of interference competition, their relatively large mouth, high fecundity and ability to tolerate sediment pollution.  In the state of New Jersey, as of 2021, anglers must destroy green sunfish when caught and should report their catch to a state fisheries biologist.  In the state of Florida, a permit is required in order to possess green sunfish as it is listed as a prohibited non-native species there.  L. cyanellus has been transplanted to countries in Africa, Asia, and Europe, where it has become established in some.

Description
The green sunfish is blue-green in color on its back and sides with yellow-flecked bony-ridged (ctenoid) scales, as well as yellow coloration on the ventral sides. The gill covers and sides of head have broken bright blue stripes, causing some to mistakenly confuse them with bluegill. They also have a dark spot located near the back end of the dorsal fin, the bases of the anal fins. and on the ear plate.  It has a relatively big mouth and long snout that extends to beneath the middle of the eye.  Its pectoral fins are short with rounded edges containing 13-14 pectoral fin rays, a dorsal fin with about 10 dorsal spines and a homocercal tail.  The typical length ranges from about 3-7 in and usually weighs less than a pound.  The green sunfish reaches a maximum recorded length of about 30 cm (12 in), with a maximum recorded weight of 960 g (2.2 lb).  Identification of sunfish species from one another can sometimes be difficult as these species frequently hybridize.

Habitat

The species prefers areas in sluggish backwaters, lakes, and ponds with gravel, sand, or bedrock bottoms.  They also can be found in very muddy waters and are able to tolerate poor water conditions.  Green sunfish tend to spend their time hiding around rocks, submerged logs, plants, and other things that provide cover.

Diet
Its diet can include aquatic insects and larvae, insects that fall into the water, crayfish, snails, other molluscs, turtle food, frogs, some small fish, fish eggs, bryozoans, zooplankton, other small invertebrates, and sometimes plant material. They are omnivores.

Reproduction

Green sunfish begin spawning in the summer with the exact time varying with location and water temperature.  When they do spawn, the males create nests in shallow water by clearing depressions in the bottom, often near a type of shelter such as rocks or submerged logs.  The male defends his nest from other males using visual displays and physical force when necessary. On occasion, simply constructing a nest is sufficient for the male to attract a mate, but when it is not he will court a female with grunts and lead her to his nest.

They continue their courtship dance, swimming with each other around the nest until the female descends to deposit her eggs in the nest.  The female will lay  2,000 to 26,000 eggs and leave them for the male to guard.  He keeps watch over them until they hatch in three to five days, while protecting them and fanning them with his fins, keeping them clean and providing them with oxygenated water.  When they hatch, the fry remain near the nest for a few days, then leave to feed and fend for themselves.  After the eggs have hatched, the male will often seek to attract another female to lay her eggs in his nest. Lepomis cyanellus typically live between 4 and 6 years in the wild.

Green sunfish tend to nest in areas close to other green sunfish, as well as other species of sunfish.  Due to the close proximity of multiple nests, a green sunfish female may deposit some of her eggs into the nest of a male of a different species.  This in turn leads to the next generation containing some amount of hybrids.  These green sunfish hybrids will often look like a combination of their parents, often making it difficult to distinguish one species from another.

Anatomy and Physiology
The retina of the green sunfish includes a mosaic of cone cells and double cone cells in a regular arrangement. The green sunfish has been theorized to have vision that is sensitive to the polarization of light, which could enhance visibility of targets in scattering media if a processing technique called polarization difference imaging is employed by the fish.  Experimental evidence, however, suggests that green sunfish are not able to visually discriminate on the basis of light polarization.  Thus, the function of the green sunfish's retinal patterning is not known, although the two different types of cone cell present in green sunfish do facilitate color discrimination.

See also: Vision in fish

IGFA Records
The International Game Fish Association (IGFA) all tackle world record for the species stands at 0.96kg (2lb 2oz), caught from Stockton Lake, Missouri in 1971.

Etymology
The generic name Lepomis derives from the Greek λεπίς (scale) and πώμα (cover, plug, operculum).  The specific epithet, cyanellus, derives from the Greek κυανός (blue).

Aquaria 
Likely the most aggressive sunfish. Difficult to keep with other green sunfishes, other sunfishes, or even other perciform fishes in general unless kept in very spacious aquaria or ponds. Like many fishes, more tolerant of distantly related species (i.e. catfishes and minnows), if too large to be eaten. Very aware of environment outside of aquarium, making it an engaging "wet pet." Accepts a variety of foods (flakes, pellets, krill, brine shrimp, bloodworms, and live prey).

References

General References

Axelrod, Herbert R. et al. (2007) Dr. Axelrod's Atlas of freshwater aquarium fishes T.F.H. Publications, Neptune City, New Jersey,  
Philips, Gary, Schmid, W., Underhill, J. (1982) "Fishes of the Minnesota Region". University of Minnesota Press, Minneapolis, Minnesota, 
Page, Lawrence, Burr, B. (1991) "A Field Guide to Freshwater Fishes". Houghton Mifflin Company, Boston, New York, 
"Green Sunfish." Ohio Department of Natural Resources - Camping, Boating, Fishing, Hunting, Biking, Hiking in Ohio. Web. 26 Apr. 2011. <http://www.dnr.state.oh.us/Home/species_a_to_z/SpeciesGuideIndex/greensunfish/tabid/6655/Default.aspx >.
"Sunfish Biology and Identification: Minnesota DNR." Minnesota Department of Natural Resources: Minnesota DNR. Web. 26 Apr. 2011. <http://www.dnr.state.mn.us/fish/sunfish/biology.html>.
"Green Sunfish: Identifying Characteristics." Wyoming Game and Fish - Home - 1. Web. 26 Apr. 2011. <http://gf.state.wy.us/fishexam/species/frmGreenSunfish.aspx >.
Paulson, Nicole, and Jay T. Hatch. "Fishes of Minnesota-Green Sunfish." Green Sunfish. Minnesota Department of Natural Resources' MinnAqua Aquatic Program, 25 Aug. 2004. Web. 30 Apr. 2011. <http://hatch.cehd.umn.edu/research/fish/fishes/green_sunfish.html>.

Lepomis
Freshwater fish of the United States
Fauna of the Great Lakes region (North America)
Fauna of the Eastern United States
Fish described in 1819
Taxa named by Constantine Samuel Rafinesque